Sharon Ventura, also known as She-Thing, is a fictional character appearing in American comic books published by Marvel Comics. She has used the pseudonym Ms. Marvel and has served as a member of the Fantastic Four and the female wrestlers known as the Grapplers.

Publication history

Created by Mike Carlin and Ron Wilson, the character first appeared in Thing #27 (September 1985).

Fictional character biography

Sharon Ventura met Thing at the time when he was involved with the Unlimited Class Wrestling Federation (UCWF). Inspired by him, she signed up for the Power Broker's program in order to have her strength augmented and join the UCWF. The Power Broker (actually Curtiss Jackson), employed Dr. Karl Malus to create super-powered wrestlers for his competitions. Sharon was unaware of the criminal activities of Jackson or Malus. While boosting their subjects' strength, the pair addicted the subjects to a drug, ensuring their obedience. It has been implied that she was raped while a prisoner of Malus, which caused her to temporarily develop an intense hatred and distrust of men. Sharon managed to break free before Malus administered the drug. She adopted the costume which UCWF minder Ann Fraley (Auntie Freeze) had arranged for her, taking the name Ms. Marvel. Alongside the Thing, she battled the Grapplers and the UCWF wrestlers. She then battled the She-Hulk.

Later, Sharon was used by the Power Broker to determine if the augmentation could be reversed. Alongside Captain America, she battled the Power Broker.

Sharon later joined the Fantastic Four, and alongside the Fantastic Four she battled Diablo. Shortly after joining the Fantastic Four, Sharon was mutated by cosmic rays and took on strength and appearance similar to that of Ben Grimm, a.k.a. the Thing. Although she never officially retired her Ms. Marvel moniker, she became more popularly known as the She-Thing and it is by this name she is most known to comic book fans. She later first encountered Aron the Rogue Watcher, and battled the She-Hulk. With She-Hulk, She-Thing battled Dragon Man. With the Fantastic Four and Frightful Four, she was captured by Aron. They escaped and defeated their clones. Sharon later battled the Hulk. She-Thing was offered the chance to be human again by Doctor Doom while a then-powerless Ben Grimm chose to use one of Reed Richards' machines to revert to the Thing to save She-Thing. Alongside the Fantastic Four, she battled the Time Variance Authority. She-Thing left the Fantastic Four soon after and began working for Doctor Doom. Sharon claimed to be doing this so that Doom would cure Ben as he had her. She was sent by Doctor Doom to spy on the Fantastic Four, where she first met Alicia Masters. With Mister Fantastic and the Thing, she was captured by Aron, but rescued by the Molecule Man and Doctor Doom. Alongside the Fantastic Four, she battled the Secret Defenders. Alongside the Fantastic Four, Lyja, and the Inhumans, she battled Doctor Doom. When she refused to betray her friends in the Fantastic Four to Doctor Doom, Doom spitefully mutated her into a much more monstrous form. After a bout of insanity, she briefly joined the Frightful Four and battered Sue Storm Richards to within inches of her life.

Years later, She-Thing had a guest appearance in Marvel Knights 4 #21 (2005), a spinoff of the main Fantastic Four book. The appearance established that she was indeed alive and well in the Marvel Universe and her attire implied she was still residing with Wingfoot. Her absence was poked fun at, as she stated that she could not believe anybody still had her number.

Sharon Ventura was later seen again in her She-Thing form.

During the 2008 "Secret Invasion" storyline, a Skrull impersonating Sharon's "She-Thing" persona is killed by the Skrull Kill Krew. The real Sharon is recovered alive from a downed Skrull ship after the final battle of the invasion. Sharon attends a support group meeting with the others who were replaced by Skrulls.

Sharon has since been revealed as a prisoner in the Raft, with evidence suggesting that she is part of a plot to destabilize the Fantastic Four.

Following the 2015 "Secret Wars" storyline, Ventura has returned to her original human appearance, and has been seen wrestling in her original outfit.

Powers and abilities
As Ms. Marvel, Sharon had superhuman strength and endurance, thanks to augmentation of her physical attributes by Dr. Karl Malus on behalf of the Power Broker. The mutagenic effect due to exposure to cosmic radiation that turned her into the She-Thing later greatly increased her physical attributes and durability.

Sharon is highly proficient in hand-to-hand combat, and skilled at various martial arts, including tae kwon do and American boxing. She is also an expert stuntwoman, scuba diver, skydiver, motorcyclist, mountain climber, skier, lion tamer, and wrestler. She attended a military academy until she was expelled.

As part of Ben Grimm's Fantastic Four, she demonstrated her intelligence by solving complicated situations with her intuition and cunning. She stated that she was always the top student in school.

In other media

Video games
 Sharon Ventura's Ms. Marvel appearance appears as an alternate costume for Ms. Marvel (Carol Danvers) in Marvel: Ultimate Alliance.

References

External links
 Sharon Ventura at Marvel.com

Characters created by Mike Carlin
Characters created by Ron Wilson
Comics characters introduced in 1985
Fantastic Four
Fictional attempted suicides
Fictional professional wrestlers
Marvel Comics characters with superhuman strength
Marvel Comics female superheroes
Marvel Comics martial artists
Marvel Comics mutates